Yeule (stylised as yeule) is the musical project of Singaporean songwriter and producer Nat Ćmiel (born Natasha Yelin Chang). Formed in 2012, Yeule incorporates elements of ambient, glitch and Asian post-pop. The name Yeule is derived from the Final Fantasy character of the same name (spelled differently), as well as their middle name.

Early life
Ćmiel was born Natasha Yelin Chang in Singapore where they attended school. They first started playing music at the age of 6 on their parents' Yamaha piano and learned classically although eventually dropped taking lessons, and wanted to explore something more challenging which led them to guitar and drums. Ćmiel initially started playing waltz pieces, though they soon moved onto songs from the soundtracks of Final Fantasy X and Kingdom Hearts. They later went onto sing in a jazz band under the name Riot Diet, covering songs from Ella Fitzgerald and the Pixies. After graduating from high school, they applied to Central Saint Martins to study fashion communication and womenswear.

Growing up, feelings of loneliness and depression were present due in part to Ćmiel's nomadic upbringing. They found solace on the internet, which would influence their later works.

History
Ćmiel's first release under the Yeule title was their self titled EP on March 3, 2014.

On December 11, 2016, Ćmiel released their second EP, Pathos, which was dedicated to David Singh.

Ćmiel followed up with the OST to interactive simulator game Lost Memories Dot Net, which was released on July 17, 2017.

On September 27, 2017, Ćmiel released their third EP, Coma. With regard to the writing, they said that "I wrote this album to commemorate the people I'd lost." The EP received a positive reception with Duncan Cooper of The Fader describing it as "dream-pop perfection".

Ćmiel signed to Bayonet Records on July 17, 2019.

On October 25, 2019, Ćmiel released their debut studio album Serotonin II. On the process of creating the album they said that "Writing the record, I was dreadful. I didn't ask for much, I don't need to be happy. I just wanted to be content." The album received a positive critical reception with Jude Noel of Tiny Mix Tapes giving the album 4/5 and saying that "Melancholia aside, it's Serotonin II's impeccable sound design that has kept me coming back".

Ćmiel teased the release of their second album Glitch Princess via Bayonet Records with a track titled "My Name is Nat Ćmiel"—released at the end of 2020. The full album was released on February 4, 2022. It was qualified as "pioneering" by Colin Lodewick from Pitchfork and featured in their 'Best New Music' section with a critical score of 8.3.

In between "My Name Is Nat Ćmiel" and Glitch Princess, Ćmiel released the remix EP Serotonin X Remixes and the covers album Nuclear War Post X, the latter issued directly through their website as a limited edition paperback art book with a download for the entire album.

Personal life
Ćmiel graduated from Central Saint Martins in London for a degree in Fine Arts in 2020. They are non-binary.

Discography

Studio albums
 Serotonin II (2019)
 Glitch Princess (2022)

Soundtrack
Lost Memories Dot Net (2017)

Extended play
Yeule (2014)
Pathos (2016)
Coma (2017)
Serotonin X Remixes (2021)

Singles
 "Pocky Boy" (2019)
 "Pretty Bones" (2019)
 "Pixel Affection" (2019)
 "Poison Arrow" (2019)
 "My Name Is Nat Ćmiel" (2020)
 "The Things They Did for Me Out of Love" (2021)
 "Don't Be So Hard on Your Own Beauty" (2021)
 "Friendly Machine" (2021)
 "Too Dead Inside" (2022)

Collaborations
Akuma des Akum – "Urbangarde" (yeule Remix) (2021)
Car Seat Headrest – "Deadlines" (yeule Remix) (2021)
Tohji ft. yeule - “shell” (2022)

References 

Living people
People from Singapore
Ambient musicians
Musicians from London
Singaporean musicians
Synth-pop musicians
1997 births
Non-binary musicians
Singaporean LGBT people
LGBT singers